Tangjiakou Subdistrict is a subdistrict located on the western side of Hedong District, Tianjin. it borders Xiangyanglou and Shanghang Road Subdistricts to its east, Dazhigu and Dawangzhuang Subdistricts to its south, and Chunhua Subdistrict to its northwest. It had a total population of 72,845 as of 2010.

Its name can be translated as "Tang family's Gate".

History

Administrative divisions 
By the end of 2021, Tangjiakou Subdistrict administered 12 communities. They are, by the order of their Administrative Division Codes:

References 

Township-level divisions of Tianjin
Hedong District, Tianjin